Poltergeist: The Legacy is a Canadian horror television series which ran from 1996 to 1999. The series tells the story of the members of a secret society known as the Legacy and their efforts to protect humankind from occult dangers. Despite bearing the Poltergeist name, there is no real connection between the show and the Poltergeist trilogy aside from the title.

Poltergeist: The Legacy debuted on Showtime, and all first-run episodes of the first three seasons premiered on that network, though they were later syndicated. After the third season, Showtime cancelled the show, and the rights were purchased by Sci Fi Channel which continued the series for another season. This same pattern was followed by Stargate SG-1, which also debuted on Showtime, was also sold into syndication, and was rescued from cancellation by Sci Fi.

The fourth season of Poltergeist: The Legacy featured an episode starring WWE wrestler The Undertaker as a being from Hell who collected souls, a deliberate crossover with RAW, which was also airing on the USA Network at the time and earning the network some of the highest ratings on cable TV. It was hoped that this cameo would help boost awareness of the new show, and thus generate a larger audience (just as USA had attempted to do by having Shawn Michaels appear on Pacific Blue).

In 2009 Poltergeist: The Legacy aired on NBC Universal's horror and suspense-themed cable channel Chiller.

Series overview

Episodes

Season 1 (1996)

Season 2 (1997)

Season 3 (1998)

Season 4 (1999)

References 

Lists of Canadian television series episodes
Lists of supernatural horror television series episodes
Poltergeist (franchise)